The America-class ships of the line were a class of two 74-gun third rates. They were built for the Royal Navy to the lines of the French  ship , which had been captured in 1794 and renamed HMS Impetueux.

Ships

Builder: Barnard, Deptford Wharf
Ordered: 10 June 1795
Launched: 2 February 1798
Fate: Broken up, 1850

Builder: Dudman, Deptford Wharf
Ordered: 10 June 1795
Launched: 2 May 1798
Fate: Broken up, 1835

References

Lavery, Brian (2003) The Ship of the Line - Volume 1: The development of the battlefleet 1650–1850. Conway Maritime Press. .
Winfield,Rif (2008) British Warships in the Age of Sail 1793-1817: Design, Construction, Careers and Fates. 2nd edition, Seaforth Publishing, 2008. .

 
Ship of the line classes
1798 ships